Nails Inc. is a London, England-based nail polish company founded by Thea Green MBE.

Thea Green
Thea Green was born and brought up in Hoylake on the Wirral Peninsula, near Liverpool. Her father was a company director of Littlewoods, and her mother a housewife. She completed a degree in public relations and journalism at the London College of Fashion. While studying, she assisted on the fashion desk at the Daily Mail newspaper, and then Tatler magazine. Joining Tatler as fashion co-oordinator on graduation, she became fashion editor aged 24.

Green was appointed Member of the Order of the British Empire (MBE) in the 2011 Birthday Honours for services to the beauty industry.

History
Green noticed on travelling to New York city, the number of nail bars that were easily available. Working on a business plan with business partner MT Carney, they raised £200,000 through investors, and launched their first store in 1999 in South Molton Street in the West End of London.

After opening the first three stores in London, as the business expanded Carney left the business with her family for the United States.

In 2000, Nails Inc opened department store concessions. 

In 2003, the company launched their training academy for beauty therapists in London. In 2005 they launched the luxury "champagne nail bar."

Present
Nails.INC is a homegrown, British nail brand. The company has concessions within key retailers, including Selfridges, John Lewis, Waitrose, QVC, Amazon and Look Fantastic, as well as Sephora, Target and Sallys in the USA.

The company now has stores in the UK, US, Australia, and Japan.

In November 2012, Nails.INC opened a nail bar in the Harvey Nichols Beauty Bazaar - a concept store located in the Liverpool One shopping centre, in the centre of Liverpool.

In June 2020, Nails.INC posted a message with its 240,000 followers on Instagram: Nails.INC will contribute proceeds for the whole month of June to Black Lives Matter. "We stand with the fight against systematic racism," the beauty brand shared on the 1 June post.

Awards
2002 CEW Achiever Award
2011 Awarded MBE (Member of the Order of the British Empire)
2011 Ernst and Young Entrepreneur of the Year
2011 First Women Awards Retail & Consumer Winner
2019 Allure Best of Beauty Award

References

Retail companies established in 1999
Companies based in the City of Westminster
Nail care
Retail companies of the United Kingdom
Cosmetics companies of the United Kingdom
British brands
1999 establishments in England